Artem Yurievich Sitak (born 8 February 1986) is a Russian-born New Zealand professional tennis player. On 11 August 2008, he reached his highest ATP singles ranking of World No. 299, whilst his highest doubles ranking of World No. 32 was reached on 10 September 2018, after the US Open. He is the younger brother of Dmitri Sitak, who was also a professional tennis player.

Junior years
Coached during the 1990s by Santini, as a 13-year-old in 1999, Sitak received a wildcard into the main draw of an ITF junior tournament in Russia as a 13-year-old in 1999. He was defeated by Evgeni Smirnov 6–4, 6–1. The following year he entered the qualifying draw of the same tournament, and defeated future ATP top 50 player Denis Istomin 6–0, 6–1 to win his first ITF junior match. Sitak was taken out in the third and final round of qualifying by a future ATP top 100 player Teimuraz Gabashvili 6–4, 7–5.

At the age of 14, Sitak won the prestigious Orange Bowl.

Sitak made his first junior Grand Slam appearance at the age of 15 at the 2002 Australian Open where he was beaten in straight sets by Australian Christopher Roman. Sitak's last junior tournament came a year later at the 2003 Australian Open where he was eliminated by Korean Suk Hyun-joon in the first round.

Senior career

2002: Pro debut
Sitak began his senior career in 2002 at a challenger event in Togliatti, Russia, where he received a wildcard into the main draw but fell in the first round to Thomas Blake, older brother of former top 10 player James Blake.

2005: First Futures title
Sitak's first title came in 2005 in a Russian Futures tournament, where he defeated Pavel Chekhov 4–6, 6–4, 6–4 in the final.

2011
Sitak began 2011 under the New Zealand flag and received a wildcard into the 2011 Heineken Open qualifying, where he was defeated by Frenchman Ludovic Walter 6–3, 6–4 in the first round.

2012
He won the men's singles in the Ojai Tennis Tournament in 2012.

2014: First ATP doubles title
Sitak partnered Polish tennis player Mateusz Kowalczyk to win the 2014 MercedesCup doubles title, defeating Philipp Oswald and Guillermo Garcia-Lopez 2–6, 6–1, 10–7 in the final.

2017: New partnership with Koolhof
Sitak's long-running doubles partnership with Nicholas Monroe came to an end after Wimbledon in 2017, and he subsequently teamed up with Dutch player Wesley Koolhof.  They reached the final in Atlanta, losing to the Bryan brothers, and lost in the first round at the US Open before winning a Challenger event in Szczecin, Poland, and losing another ATP final, this time in Metz, to Julien Benneteau and Édouard Roger-Vasselin.

2018

Starting the new year in Brisbane, Sitak and Koolhof lost in the semi-finals to Leonardo Mayer and Horacio Zeballos.  They lost in the first round in Auckland to Michael Venus and Raven Klaasen, and then 7–6(5), 4–6, 4–6 in the second round of the Australian Open to the eventual winners, Oliver Marach and Mate Pavić.  Although they were not in the original draw for the Mixed Doubles, Sitak and Olga Savchuk teamed up as alternates after an injury to Anastasia Rodionova in her women's doubles match meant that she and Marach could not participate.  They were beaten in a first-round match tie-break by Nadiia Kichenok and Marcel Granollers.

Sitak and Koolhof then went to Newport Beach in California where, as top seeds, they lost in the first round, 2–6, 1–6, to Treat Huey and Denis Kudla.  After that came the Davis Cup where, in Tianjin, Sitak and Marcus Daniell lost their doubles tie to the lowly-ranked Chinese pair of Gong Mao-Xin and Zhang Ze.  Sitak and Koolhof then lost in the quarter-finals at Montpellier before going all the way to the final in the New York Open, being beaten by Max Mirnyi and Philipp Oswald in a match tie-break.  They followed that up with a first round loss at Delray Beach to Scott Lipsky and Divij Sharan.

Their up and down season continued in Brazil, where they reached the final in São Paulo, but were beaten in straight sets by Federico Delbonis and Máximo González.  Their next stop was Irving, Texas, where they lost in the semi-finals of the ATP Challenger to Alexander Peya and Philipp Petzschner.  Moving to Europe, and playing in the Alicante Challenger in Spain as preparation for the European clay court season, they won their second title together when they beat Guido Andreozzi and Ariel Behar 6–3, 6–2, in the final, but they lost in the first round of their next tournament in Marrakech.  In the Hungarian Open they beat the top seeds Nikola Mektic and Alexander Peya in the first round, but lost in the second to Marcin Matkowski and Sitak's former partner Nicholas Monroe.

Their next tournament was at Estoril where they went all the way to the final before losing to the British pair of Kyle Edmund and Cameron Norrie, 2–6, 4–6.  They then lost in the first round of the Bordeaux Challenger tournament after Sitak had been hit in the right ear by a smash from Radu Albot, and also in the first round in Geneva, the last tournament before the French Open.

At Roland Garros, Sitak and Koolhof beat Andre Begemann and Antonio Sancic in the first round, then the ninth seeds Ivan Dodig and Rajeev Ram, before going down to fifth seeds Juan Sebastian Cabal and Robert Farah.  All three matches went to a deciding set.  After the tournament finished it was announced that the pair would split, with Koolhof joining Sitak's fellow New Zealander, and former partner, Marcus Daniell, and Sitak linking up with Indian Divij Sharan.

Sitak and Sharan's first tournament together was at 's-Hertogenbosch, where they were beaten in the semi-finals by Michael Venus and Raven Klaasen.  They then lost in a big upset in the first round of qualifying at Halle, before finding top seeds Cabal and Farah their nemesis in the first round at Eastbourne.

They reached the quarter-finals at Wimbledon, the best-ever result in a Grand Slam tournament for either of them.  They had to come from two sets down in both their second and third round matches, against Julio Peralta and Horacio Zeballos and Marcin Matkowski and Jonathan Erlich respectively, before lining up against Mike Bryan and Jack Sock in the quarter-finals.  There were three tie-break sets to start, and just one loss of serve in the fourth set was enough to seal their defeat at the hands of the eventual champions.  In mixed doubles, Sitak teamed up with Ukrainian Lyudmyla Kichenok to beat Argentina's Leonardo Mayer and Maria Irigoyen, but he withdrew from the second round due to fatigue from the length of the men's doubles matches.

Sitak teamed up with Erlich for the Hall of Fame Championships in Newport, marching imperiously to the final, where they very quickly swept aside clay-court specialists Marcelo Arevalo and Miguel Ángel Reyes-Varela.  Sitak maintained that it was their experience which counted – it was the 39th ATP final for Erlich, and the 11th for Sitak, but just the first for both their opponents.

Moving on to Washington DC for the Citi Open, Sitak and Sharan beat Jamie Cerretani and Leander Paes in the first round before losing to Jamie Murray and Bruno Soares in the quarter-finals.  Sitak then entered the Toronto Masters with Stefanos Tsitsipas, and received a first-round call up as an alternate for a withdrawn pair.  They ended up playing Michael Venus and Raven Klaasen, and lost 6–4, 6–4.  Moving on to Cincinnati for the next Masters event, the pair qualified for direct acceptance.  In the first round they were drawn against Ivan Dodig and Robin Haase, and lost in a match tie-break.

In his last tournament before the US Open, Sitak teamed up with Aisam-ul-Haq Qureshi at Winston-Salem.  They beat Max Mirnyi and Philipp Oswald, then Marcelo Demoliner and Santiago Gonzalez, before falling to Jamie Cerretani and Leander Paes in the semi-final.  In the US Open, Sitak and Sharan lost to eventual runners-up Lukasz Kubot and Marcelo Melo in the second round, while Sitak and Lyudmyla Kichenok were beaten in a tight first round battle in the mixed doubles, losing 10–8 in the match tie-break to fourth seeds Latisha Chan and Ivan Dodig.

The US Open was followed by New Zealand's Davis Cup tie against Korea in Gimcheon, where Sitak and debutant Ajeet Rai were successful in their doubles rubber.  However, New Zealand lost the tie 3–2, and were relegated to Group II of the Asia/Oceania zone for the first time in five years.  Dashing back to France for what turned out to be just one match, Sitak, again with Qureshi, lost in the first round at Metz to Oliver Marach and Jurgen Melzer.  Reunited with Sharan a week later in China, they were upset in the first round of the Chengdu Open by Austin Krajicek and Jeevan Nedunchezhiyan.

In the Japan Open they drew Jamie Murray and Bruno Soares in the first round, and lost in straight sets, and then were able to get into the Shanghai Masters as an alternate entry, where they lost in the second round to Kubot and Melo, who went on to win the title.  Their next event was the European Open in Antwerp where, as fourth seeds, they lost to second seeds Nicolas Mahut and Édouard Roger-Vasselin in an entertaining semi-final.

From there they travelled to Basel for the Swiss Indoors Open, where they lost in an upset result in the semi-finals to Mischa and Alexander Zverev.  They finished their season at the Paris Masters where, with only an hour's notice, they again took the court as an alternate.  They beat Feliciano and Marc Lopez in the first round, but lost in straight sets in the second round to the best team in the world for 2018, Mike Bryan and Jack Sock.

2019
With a new partner in the left-handed American Austin Krajicek, Sitak began 2019 in Brisbane, where they lost in the quarter-finals to Rajeev Ram and Joe Salisbury.  They also lost in the quarter-finals in Auckland, this time to Bob and Mike Bryan, the former playing his first tournament since being injured in Monte Carlo and subsequently having surgery to replace his hip.

The Australian Open also saw them record a win and a loss, beating Leander Paes and Miguel Ángel Reyes-Varela in the first round, but losing a tight match to eventual semi-finalists Ryan Harrison and Sam Querrey in the second, 6–4, 7–6(5).  Sitak had another new partner in the mixed doubles, teaming up with former World doubles number one Ekaterina Makarova.  Seeded eighth, they lost in the first round to Andreja Klepač and Édouard Roger-Vasselin.

Sitak and Krajicek then lost in the first round at Montpellier before going to Rotterdam, where they got into the main draw as Lucky Losers, but again lost in the first round.  The same fate awaited them in Rio de Janeiro, but they had far better luck in Acapulco, where they finished runners-up to Mischa and Alexander Zverev after easily taking the first set of the final.  It was the first ATP500 series final for both Sitak and Krajicek.

Because of their relative rankings, Sitak found a new partner for Indian Wells in singles specialist Nikoloz Basilashvili, but they went out in the first round to eighth seeds Henri Kontinen and John Peers.  That meant that he and Krajicek were able to go straight to Phoenix, where they had walk-overs in the first two rounds of the Phoenix Challenger, beat Jamie Cerretani and Nicholas Monroe in the semi-finals, and lost to Jamie Murray and Neal Skupski in the final.

From there they went to Miami, where they lost in the first round, and on to Houston for the US Clay Court Championships, where they lost to the Skupski brothers in the semi-finals.  That was followed by a loss in qualifying in Barcelona and a quarter-final loss in Munich before a first round loss in Madrid, where they had got in as an alternate pair.

They also got into the Italian Open as an alternate pair, and this time made it to the second round, losing to eventual champions Juan Sebastián Cabal and Robert Farah.  Another first round loss, this time as second seeds in Geneva, preceded their attempt at the French Open, where Krajicek dropped a bombshell just a couple of days before their first round match by announcing that he would be ending their partnership after this tournament. Seeded 16th, the pair didn't have a single practice together before losing in the first round to Hsieh Cheng-peng and Christopher Rungkat.  He and Makoto Ninomiya played mixed doubles together, but lost in a first round match tie-break to eventual semi-finalists Nadiia Kichenok and Aisam-ul-Haq Qureshi.

Sitak had different partners for each of his first three grass tournaments before winning the Antalya Open with Jonathan Erlich in a week where the on-court temperatures seldom dropped below 40 degrees Celsius.  They defeated Ivan Dodig and Filip Polášek in straight sets in the final, having beaten French Open champions Kevin Krawietz and Andreas Mies in the first round.  At Wimbledon Sitak and Erlich lost in the first round to Máximo González and Horacio Zeballos, but Sitak went much further in the mixed doubles.

Although he and Laura Siegemund made it to the quarter-finals before losing to fifth seeds Květa Peschke and Wesley Koolhof, it's their first round match against Darija Jurak and Ken Skupski which will go down in history, the sprinklers facing Sitak and Siegemund bursting into life as they sat down with the score at 4–3 in the final set. The match was eventually moved to another court to be finished.  As if that wasn't enough, their top quality third round match against third seeds Gabriela Dabrowski and Mate Pavić took three hours and 17 minutes, becoming the first mixed doubles match to require Wimbledon's innovation of a tie-break at 12–12 in the final set.

Sitak and Erlich were unable to defend their title in Newport, losing in the first round, before Sitak teamed up with Radu Albot to reach the semi-finals in Atlanta, but they lost in the first round in Los Cabos.  Next up was the US Open, where Sitak and Denys Molchanov lost in the first round to second seeds Łukasz Kubot and Marcelo Melo.  The same fate befell him in the mixed doubles, where he and Lucie Hradecká also lost in the first round.

Two more first round losses followed before Sitak reunited with Divij Sharan.  Although losing their first match together, they reached the quarter-finals of the Japan Open.  They made the Paris Masters as alternates, beating Pavić and Bruno Soares in the first round before losing to Jérémy Chardy and Fabrice Martin in the second.  Two first round losses in Challenger events ended the 2019 season for Sitak.

2020
Sitak had a six-week break before he and Sharan started the new year with a first round loss in Doha.  They were more successful in Auckland, upsetting top seeds John Peers and Michael Venus in the first round before losing a tight match in the second against Sander Gillé and Joran Vliegen.  They lost in the second round of the Australian Open to Mate Pavić and Bruno Soares and in the first round in Pune when seeded second.  Then followed three tournaments with a win and a loss – New York, Delray Beach (where they lost to eventual champions Bob and Mike Bryan) and the Chilean capital, Santiago.

The following week saw the pair split up to play for their respective countries in the Davis Cup, with Sitak joining Marcus Daniell for the first time in two years as New Zealand played Venezuela for the first time ever, in Auckland.  It was a successful return, as the pair won their rubber in straight sets to help New Zealand to a 3–1 win and a place in the next round, against South Korea.  Just a day later came the news that the partnership with Sharan was over, the Indian deciding that their results weren't good enough to justify continuing as a pair. That was followed by the suspension of all international tennis due to the Covid-19 coronavirus.

Sitak returned to action in August with a new partner, Slovakian Igor Zelenay.  They lost in the first round in two Challenger events in Prague, but took their first title at the third attempt, in Ostrava.  They were the only alternate team to get into the French Open, but lost in the first round, as they did in a Challenger in Parma.  They fared better at a new ATP250 tournament in Santa Margherita di Pula, Sardinia, losing in the quarter-finals to eventual winners Marcus Daniell and Philipp Oswald, but this was their last tournament together.

With partners for just one tournament at a time, Sitak lost in the quarter-finals in Istanbul and Nur-Sultan, and in the first round of the Paris Masters.  He got to the quarter-finals of the Sofia Open in Bulgaria before flying to South America for a final Challenger event, reaching the semi-finals in Lima.

2021
The early part of 2021 saw Sitak continue to criss-cross the globe.  Starting in Australia, Sitak and Federico Delbonis lost in the second round of the Great Ocean Road Open to fellow New Zealanders Marcus Daniell and Michael Venus, before Sitak and Jonny O'Mara were eliminated in the first round of the Australian Open by eventual runners-up Rajeev Ram and Joe Salisbury.

Sitak then paired up with Nicholas Monroe for the first time in several years, losing in the first round in three tournaments in South America before he moved north to Acapulco.  Although he and Dominik Koepfer lost in the final qualifying round, they took their place in the main draw as Lucky Losers, but were beaten in a match tie-break by Marcelo Demoliner and Santiago González.

Sitak then headed to Europe, where he and Sergio Martos Gornés lost in the semi-finals of a Challenger event in Lugano, having won a marathon match-tie break (17–15) in their previous match.  That was followed by first round losses in both a Challenger and an ATP tournament in Marbella.

At the 2021 Astana Open he reached the semifinal in doubles partnering Ričardas Berankis, where they lost to top seeds and eventual champions Santiago Gonzalez and Andres Molteni.

ATP career finals

Doubles: 13 (5 titles, 8 runners-up)

ATP Challenger and ITF Futures finals

Singles: 17 (5 titles, 12 runners-up)

Doubles: 62 (29 titles, 33 runners-up)

Davis Cup (21)

Note: walkover victory when Pakistan abandoned the tie in 2013 is not counted as a match played
   indicates the outcome of the Davis Cup match followed by the score, date, place of event, the zonal classification and its phase, and the court surface.

Performance timelines

Doubles 
Current through the 2022 Davis Cup.

Mixed doubles 
''Although the US and French Opens took place in 2020, mixed doubles were not included in either event due to the COVID-19 coronavirus.

References

External links
 
 
 
 

1986 births
Living people
Russian male tennis players
Naturalised citizens of New Zealand
New Zealand male tennis players
New Zealand people of Russian descent
People from Orenburg
Russian emigrants to New Zealand
Tennis players from Moscow
Universiade medalists in tennis
Universiade gold medalists for Russia
Medalists at the 2005 Summer Universiade